Dan Michman (born 28 June 1947) is a Jewish historian. He is the head of the International Institute for Holocaust Research at Yad Vashem in Jerusalem and incumbent of the John Najmann Chair of Holocaust studies.

Michman was born in Amsterdam in 1947 as a child of Holocaust survivors, who emigrated to Israel in 1957. His father, Dr. Jozeph Michman (Jozeph Melkman) became head of the commemoration centre Yad Vashem, founded four years earlier. After completing the compulsory military service Dan Michman studied Hebrew and Jewish history at the Hebrew University of Jerusalem. He received his Ph.D. in history at this university in 1978 with a dissertation on the German Jewish refugees in the Netherlands 1933-1940. Archival research for this dissertation was done in the Netherlands in the years 1972-1976. After this he taught Modern Jewish history and Holocaust history at Bar-Ilan University in Ramat-Gan, at first as a lecturer, later as a full professor. Since 1983 he also headed the Arnold and Leona Finkler Institute for Holocaust Research at Bar-Ilan University. In addition, he developed a comprehensive course on Holocaust history for the Open University of Israel. In 2000 he was appointed Chief Historian at the International Institute for Holocaust Research of Yad Vashem and in 2011 he became the Head of this institute. In these positions he co-organized various international scholarly conferences and edited and co-authored volumes with conference papers and proceedings. His research focuses on Holocaust historiography, the Nazi ghettoization policy, imposed Jewish governing bodies under Nazi rule ('Judenräte' or Jewish Councils), Jewish religious life during the Holocaust and Dutch and Belgian Jewry during the Holocaust. In his research and publications he stresses the non-violent ways that Jews took to resist genocide. In 2015 he retired as professor of Modern Jewish History at Bar-Ilan University, but he remains actively involved in his function as Head of the International Institute for Holocaust Research at Yad Vashem.

With his wife Bruria he has six children, 26 grandchildren and meanwhile two great-grandchildren.

Bibliography 
 The Jewish Refugees from Germany in the Netherlands 1933–1940. Ph.D. dissertation, The Hebrew University, Jerusalem, 1978; 2 volumes. Hebrew text, extensive English summary in vol. 1, pp. iv–xxxiii. 
 „The Committee for Jewish Refugees in Holland (1933–1940)“, in: Yad Vashem Studies, vol. 14 (1981), pp. 205–232. 
 Jozeph Michman, Hartog Beem, Dan Michman, with the assistance of Victor Brilleman and Joop Sanders: Pinkas. Geschiedenis van de joodse gemeenschap in Nederland (Pinkas. History of the Jewish community in the Netherlands). Amsterdam: Contact, revised and updated second edition 1999; 672 pages.   (First edition Amsterdam/Ede: Nederlands-Israëlitisch Kerkgenootschap/Joods Historisch Museum/Kluwer 1992, translated from the Hebrew by Ruben Verhasselt. Original Hebrew edition: Pinkas Hakehilloth: Holland, Jerusalem: Yad Vashem, 1985).
 Het Liberale Jodendom in Nederland 1929–1943 (Liberal [i.e. Reform] Jewry in the Netherlands, 1929–1943), Amsterdam: Van Gennep, 1988; 224 p. .
 (Editor, Introduction and co-author) Belgium and the Holocaust: Jews, Belgians, Germans. Jerusalem: Yad Vashem, 1998; 593 p. (Second edition 2000). .
 (Editor) Remembering the Holocaust in Germany, 1945–2000. German strategies and Jewish responses. New York: Peter Lang, 2002; 172 p. . 
 .
 (Editor, with introductory article) Encyclopedia of the Righteous Among the Nations: Belgium. Jerusalem: Yad Vashem, 2005; 296 p. .
 .
 David Bankier, Dan Michman (eds.): Holocaust and justice: representation and historiography of the Holocaust in post-war trials. Jerusalem: Yad Vashem / New York: Berghahn Books, 2010; 343 p. .
 .
 .
 David Bankier, Dan Michman, Iael Nidam-Orvieto (eds.): Pius XII and the Holocaust: Current State of Research. Jerusalem: Yad Vashem, 2012; 277 p. .
 "The Jewish Dimension of the Holocaust in Dire Straits? Current Challenges of Interpretation and Scope", in: Norman Goda (ed.), Jewish Histories of the Holocaust. New Transnational Approaches (New York: Berghahn, 2014), pp. 17–38.
 (Editor and Introduction) Hiding, Sheltering and Borrowing Identities. Avenues of Rescue During the Holocaust. Jerusalem: Yad Vashem, 2017; 408 p. .
 Dina Porat and Dan Michman (eds.), in co-operation with Haim Saadoun: The End of 1942: A Turning Point in World War II and in the Comprehension of the Final Solution? Yad Vashem, Jerusalem, 2017, 384 p. .
 (Co-editor with Yosef Kaplan) Religious Cultures of Dutch Jewry. Leiden: Brill, 2017; 370 p. .
 .
 'Why is the Shoah called "the Shoah" or "the Holocaust"? On the history of the terminology for the Nazi anti-Jewish campaign', in: Journal of Holocaust Research, 35-4 (2021), pp. 233–256.

Further reading

References

External links 
 Official website at University of Pittsburgh

1947 births
20th-century Israeli historians
21st-century Israeli historians
Historians of Israel
Holocaust studies
Living people